Church of San Bartolomé may refer to several churches in Spain:

Church of San Bartolomé (Campisábalos)
Church of San Bartolomé (Logroño)
Church of San Bartolomé (Tarazona de la Mancha)
Church of San Bartolomé (Toledo)